The Rural Municipality of Browning No. 34 is a rural municipality (RM) in the Canadian province of Saskatchewan within Census Division No. 1 and  Division No. 1.

History 
The RM of Browning No. 34 incorporated as a rural municipality on December 11, 1911. In 1912, the RM had a population of 1,800.

Geography

Communities and localities 
The following urban municipalities are surrounded by the RM.

Towns
 Lampman

The following unincorporated communities are located within the RM.

Unincorporated hamlets
 Wilmar
 Steelman
 Browning

Demographics 

Government 
The RM of Browning No. 34 is governed by an elected municipal council and an appointed administrator that meets on the second Wednesday of every month. The reeve of the RM is Pius Loustel while its administrator is Dena Scott. The RM's office is located in Lampman.

Transportation 
The Lampman Airport is located within the rural municipality.

References 

B

Division No. 1, Saskatchewan